Gravity Noir is a British synth-pop band that was established in the early 1990s.

Background

The founder of Gravity Noir, British-Belgian dual citizen Patrick John Angele Knight, performed as a Boy George tribute act and participated in several talent competitions between 1985 and 1996. In 1987 he was named among the top-12 best sound-mixers in Belgium by  magazine, which released an album featuring Knight's cover of "Everything I Own". He won second and third place on Dutch television's Soundmixshow and also appeared on the British programme Stars in Their Eyes.

During the formation of the band Gravity Noir, Knight was working on a side project called Greater Than One in 1991.
A Twelve-inch single called Listen to the rhythm flow was released under the name of Knight's own Belgian record label Jumping Man Records.

Gravity Noir first performed as Culture Club on Belgian television channel VT4 in July 1996, hosted by Jo De Poorter.

Early years 

Gravity Noir was founded in Antwerp by Knight, the only permanent member of the group. Javier Rodriguez Iglesias,  DJ Linetech, produced their first few songs before he was replaced by Peter Goos. The repertoire mainly consisted of 1980s covers. Dancers Alex da Luz and Jorg Vander Heyden completed the original band setup. The group briefly changed their name to Basics (B6), with the additions of female singer Cindy De Voeght  CJ and dancer Sofie. As B6, they recorded their first official music video for a remix that Goos made of the Orchestral Manoeuvres in the Dark hit "Enola Gay", which was broadcast on Belgian television channel FilmNet. The band continued to record demos in the late 1990s under their independent labels Jumping Man Records and Gravity Productions. On 23 April 2011, a first official single called I've Got the Power was released, under the name of "The Sisters of Divine Pleasure", featuring Knight as drag queen Titless Strangé. In 2016, Knight decided to return to using the name Gravity Noir.

Later years and up to present days 
 
Since the inception of Gravity Noir, the band has seen many members come and go. Andrew Williams joined the band in 2016 as a vocalist and wind instrumentalist, and to provide graphic designs. Williams is mainly known as an artistic painter from Wakefield in West Yorkshire and therefore appreciated for his graphic inlay. Female lead singer Ambrosia Dash, who had lent her voice for Knight's solo projects, has sung several songs since Gravity Noir's comeback.

An official single and associated video clip called Mystery Knight was released by Gravity Noir on 7 April 2016. It was recorded at Ter Apel Monastery in the Netherlands during the annual Ter Apel mediaeval festival. Four albums have been released so far: The Early Years, Handmade, Liberation and Future Days. Liberation generated two  1 hits in the UK N1M EDM (electronic dance music) charts: "Open Your Mind" and "Avalon L.A.". Between 2016 and 2019 several remixes were produced by DJ Linetech until he was banned permanently for his unprofessional behaviour.

In 2019, the band began working on Future Days for an anticipated release in 2020 and was released on 18 March. The single "Flying High" was officially released on 22 March 2019. Two successors were released. One with the title "Planet Called Love" during the summer of 2019 and the second one "Universal Party (Supernatural)" was released on Valentine's Day 2020.

Due to Knight's life-threatening heart condition, Brugada syndrome, it is no longer possible for him to perform live, and the band is seeking a new lead singer. Knight continues to compose and produce all music for Gravity Noir. He has reworked the track "The Thrifty Wife & the Kite" by the folk and ceilidh dance band Banjax into a Gravity Noir remix. A special Christmas edition was released in November 2019. The original track was written by Knight's cousin Keith Leech MBE in 1992.

A standalone production with the title "All Night Long (EP)" was released in the fall of 2020. The intention was to release an Extended play (EP), but because the total playing time exceeds the criterion for an EP, it was officially released as album. As an extra edition, Gravity Noir released a new single version of "All Night Long" as a tribute to the great André Brasseur, known for his specific use of the Hammond organ.

In December 2020, Rick Jamm from JamSphere, The Indie Music Magazine & Radio Network wrote a review saying 'Gravity Noir – ‘Future Days’ is at once impressive!' and 'This is what I would call a gateway album to a modern version of synth-pop music, which nowadays we know better as EDM. Gravity Noir started a new chapter in 2016, improving all aspects of their brand' and 'Throughout this album, you are able to get inside Gravity Noir's mindset and live through what they have worked so hard towards since their comeback.'

2021
On the occasion of Gravity Noir's 30th anniversary, Knight was a guest at Antwerp radio station Zuidrand on Sunday, 18 April for a very exclusive and rare interview, accompanied of course by music by Gravity Noir.

Unfortunately due to the COVID-19 pandemic it was the second year that Hastings, traditional Jack in the Green went live in a virtual meeting. Gravity Noir was asked to participate in a panel game and to provide a short interview. Patrick Knight is closely associated with the event and of course, he did not hesitate for a moment. In this virtual event, you can see Patrick at work as the funny 'Marquis the Bogieville'.

Social media makes it clear that Patrick Knight is once again working on a completely new project with Gravity Noir. The title of the new project was given the name Ankh, which means 'key of life' and is an ancient Egyptian hieroglyphic symbol. 'ANKH' would become the name of the new Gravity Noir album and would be released simultaneously with a documentary, a travelogue by and with Patrick Knight about ancient Egypt, expected in 2022. It is already certain that we will hear something vocally in one of the titles, by the unfortunately deceased singer Ofra Haza. The single Im Nin'alu 2021 was officially released on 14 July 2021 and will be part of the upcoming album along with a longer extended version. The single is the only one to be listed in an iTunes top 100 so far and receives quite a bit of airplay worldwide. The single also managed to get airplay on VRT, Belgium national radio & television. On 21 August, the single was broadcast in primetime on the Ann Delisi's Essential Music program of Detroit's well-known WDET-FM NPR station. On 23 August they were awarded the title of newcomer of the week, reached 7th place and climbed up to a 2nd peak position in the UK LGBTQ Music Chart TOP 50.

In October 2021, Andy Hemsley from the Hastings & St.Leonards Observer wrote, 'A Belgian band which is causing a storm in the European LGBTQ Music Charts is celebrating its links with Hastings' and also achieved the first scoop by publishing the official album cover for 'ANKH', a design by Serbian graphic artist Mihajlo Ciric, also known as a judoka, who took a silver medal at the Serbian Championships in Belgrade in 2021 and bagged a silver medal at the European Open in Sarajevo in 2022. Commenting on his success, he quoted Patrick Knight saying: “It’s not about fame and fortune, but the footprints we leave behind for future generations.”

During Halloween, CD Baby  announced a new single under the name In Time (ANKH, Travelogue Pt.8), that was intended to be released on 17 January 2022, and will be the closing track for the new album ANKH. Photo artwork by Alexander Jawfox.

Charles Temmerman passed away on 17 December 2021, the soul mate and bosom friend of Patrick Knight and backing vocalist for Gravity Noir from 1990 to 1993. As a tribute, one of the new songs on the new album 'ANKH' was given the title 'ANKH Travelogue, Pt.5 (Charles theme)'.

2022
In Time (ANKH, Travelogue Pt.8), is the second single from the album ANKH and was officially released worldwide on 17 January 2022.
It's the second time that Gravity Noir entered the iTunes charts. On 23 January 2022, In Time reached a peak position at 44 in the Belgium iTunes Top 100 of Electronic Songs. On Valentine's Day, the single entered the LGBTQ Music Chart TOP 50 as a newcomer at position 14 and climbed further to an 8th top position.

On Sunday, 6 March 2022, Patrick Knight was again a guest at Radio Zuidrand Antwerp for an extensive interview and to publicly present their latest album 'ANKH'.

In addition to fulfilling the role as a singer, lyricist, composer and producer, the list of Patrick Knight's contributions is now also supplemented by the title of film director. The trailer of the artistic feature film 'ANKH' already announces its release in the course of 2022. The original soundtrack comes from the album of the same name.

A new collaboration with Canadian DJ The Dharma Dude (Sean-Patrick Spriggs) delivers remixes of the single 'Planet Called Love', official worldwide release date, 22 April 2022.

In early July, the feature film 'ANKH' is nominated for best Art-house film and best Film score at the LGBTQ Unbordered International Film Festival in Nassau, Delaware, United States on 20 November 2022. It also won the Jury Diamond Award for Best Indie Feature during the 'Europe Film Festival' in Netherlands (1 August 2022). In September, ANKH and Patrick Knight won 4 awards at the 'Indo French International Festival' (IF Awards) for best experimental, best editing, best debut filmmaker and best international feature ,won 2 awards at the 'Triloka International Filmfare Awards', Wellington, Tamil Nadu, India, for best first time director and best original score and won 2 awards at the 'Hodu International Film Festival', Pondicherry, India, for best experimental and best editing feature film'. It also participates in the 'Paris Independent Film Festival' ( 15–21 October 2022), the 'Cannes Indie International Film Festival' (23 December 2022), the 'Berlin Revolution Film Festival' in Berlin (22 April 2023), the 'Septimius Awards' in Amsterdam (30 July 2023) and the 'RAGFF Cairo Egypt' (22 September 2023). The list of all nominations and prizes won is included in the Awards table below.

Awards 

|-
! scope="row" | 2022
| ANKH
| Best Indie
| Jury Diamond Award
| 
| Europe Film Festival
| 
|-
! scope="row" | 2022
| ANKH
| Best Experimental Feature Film
| Winner Award
| 
| Indo French International Festival
| 
|-
! scope="row" | 2022
| Patrick J. A. Knight
| Best Editing Feature Film
| Winner Award
| 
| Indo French International Festival
| 
|-
! scope="row" | 2022
| Patrick J. A. Knight
| Best Debut Filmmaker
| Special Mention Award
| 
| Indo French International Festival
| 
|-
! scope="row" | 2022
| ANKH
| Best International Feature
| Special Mention Award
| 
| Indo French International Festival
| 
|-
! scope="row" | 2022
| Patrick J. A. Knight
| Best First Time Director
| Winner Award
| 
| Triloka International Filmfare Awards
| 
|-
! scope="row" | 2022
| ANKH
| Best Original Score
| Critics Choice Award
| 
| Triloka International Filmfare Awards
| 
|-
! scope="row" | 2022
| ANKH
| Best Experimental Feature Film
| Winner Award
| 
| Hodu International Film Festival
| 
|-
! scope="row" | 2022
| Patrick J. A. Knight
| Best Editing Feature Film
| Winner Award
| 
| Hodu International Film Festival
| 
|-
! scope="row" | 2022
| ANKH
| Best Travel Film
| Winner Award
| 
| Brussels Capital Film Festival
| 
|-
! scope="row" | 2022
| Patrick J. A. Knight
| Best Original Score
| Winner Award
| 
| Brussels Capital Film Festival
| 
|-
! scope="row" | 2022
| ANKH
| Best First-Time Filmmaker's Film
| Winner / Phenomenal Attainment Award
| 
| Krimson Horyzon International Film Festival
| 
|-
! scope="row" | 2022
| Patrick J. A. Knight, ANKH
| Best Original Score
| Winner
| 
| Golden Sparrow International Film Festival
| 
|-
! scope="row" | 2022
| Patrick J. A. Knight, ANKH
| Best Cinematographer International Feature Film
| Winner
| 
| Golden Sparrow International Film Festival
| 
|-
! scope="row" | 2022
| Patrick J. A. Knight, ANKH
| Best Original Score
| Winner
| 
| International Motion Picture Awards
| 
|-
! scope="row" | 2022
| Patrick J. A. Knight
| Best Debut Filmmaker
| Winner
| 
| International Motion Picture Awards
| 
|-
! scope="row" | 2022
| Patrick J. A. Knight, Luc Verlinden
| Best Cinematography
| Winner
| 
| International Motion Picture Awards
| 
|-
! scope="row" | 2022
| Patrick J. A. Knight, ANKH
| Best Editing
| Nominee
| 
| Indie Cine Tube Awards
| 
|-
! scope="row" | 2022
| ANKH
| Best Film Score - Soundtrack
| Nominee
| 
| Indie Cine Tube Awards
| 
|-
! scope="row" | 2022
| ANKH
| Best Feature Film
| Winner
| 
| Indie Cine Tube Awards
| 
|-
! scope="row" | 2022
| ANKH
| Best Experimental Feature Film
| Nominee
| 
| San Jose International Film Awards
| 
|-
|-
! scope="row" | 2022
| ANKH
| Best Music Feature Film
| Nominee
| 
| Fusion International Film Festivals
| 
|-
! scope="row" | 2022
| Patrick J. A. Knight, ANKH
| Best Film Score/Soundtrack
| Winner / Phenomenal Attainment Award
| 
| Dreamz Catcher International Film Festival
| 
|-
! scope="row" | 2022
| Patrick J. A. Knight, ANKH
| Best Travel Vlog/Travel Film
| Winner / Winner Attainment Award
| 
| Dreamz Catcher International Film Festival
| 
|-
! scope="row" | 2022
| Patrick J. A. Knight, ANKH
| Best Experimental Feature Film
| Honorable Mention
| 
| Golden Lemur International Film Festival
| 
|-
! scope="row" | 2022
| Patrick J. A. Knight, ANKH
| Best Original Score 
| Honorable Mention
| 
| Golden Lemur International Film Festival
| 
|-
! scope="row" | 2022
| Patrick J. A. Knight, ANKH
| Best Travel & Tourism Film
| Nominee
| 
| Natourale Film Festival
| 
|-
! scope="row" | 2022
| Patrick J. A. Knight, ANKH
| Best Art-House Film
| Winner / Kudos Endeavor Award
| 
| LGBTQ Unbordered International Film Festival
| 
|-
! scope="row" | 2022
| Patrick J. A. Knight, ANKH
| Best Original Score
| Winner / Kudos Endeavor Award
| 
| LGBTQ Unbordered International Film Festival
| 
|-
! scope="row" | 2022
| Patrick J. A. Knight, ANKH
| Best Music Video
| Nominee
| 
| West Europe International Film Festival - Brussels Edition
| 
|-
! scope="row" | 2022
| Patrick J. A. Knight, ANKH
| Best Experimental Film and New Media
| Nominee
| 
| West Europe International Film Festival - Brussels Edition
| 
|-
! scope="row" | 2022
| Patrick J. A. Knight, ANKH
| Best Debut Feature Film
| Winner / Director in Focus Award
| 
| Singapore International Film Festival
| 
|-
! scope="row" | 2023
| Patrick J. A. Knight, ANKH
| Best Cinematography
| Nominee
| 
| Janjira International Film Festival
| 
|-
! scope="row" | 2023
| Patrick J. A. Knight, ANKH
| Best Experimental Feature
| Winner / Award of Recognition
| 
| The Accolade Global Film Competition
| 
|-
! scope="row" | 2023
| Patrick J. A. Knight, ANKH
| Best Original Score
| Winner / Award of Excellence
| 
| The Accolade Global Film Competition
| 
|-
! scope="row" | 2023
| Patrick J. A. Knight, ANKH
| Best Silent Film
| Nominee
| 
| Milano Blackout Film Fest
| 
|-
! scope="row" | 2023
| Patrick J. A. Knight, ANKH
| Best Arthouse Film
| Winner / Jury Special Award
| 
| Golden Wheat Awards
| 
|-
! scope="row" | 2023
| Patrick J. A. Knight, ANKH
| Best Art Video - Video Arte
| Nominee
| 
| Festival de Largos y Cortos de Santiago
| 
|-

2023
The BBC's Radio Times has included 'ANKH', the feature film, on their website and in their listing.

Dutch-language newspaper Het Laatste Nieuws based in Antwerp, Belgium has published an article about Patrick Knight's feature film 'Ankh'.

At the end of January, Cannes Film Awards published an extensive interview with director Patrick Knight. The website also confirms ANKH's participation in the 2023 edition.

Charity 
Gravity Noir recorded the single Another Dimension (Dementia) and the accompanying video for the benefit of the Alzheimer League Flanders and Alzheimer's Society United Kingdom. The presentation was supported and attended by the published press and covered by Belgium newspapers. At the beginning of 2017, Gravity Noir released the single and video for "Much Too Soon to Say Goodbye" to raise discussion around the issues of suicide. In September 2018, they released the single and video for "Open Your Mind" (The Future is Ours Remix). For this track, they found the support and help from film director Lubomir Arsov, who provided images from his 2017 short film In-shadow: A Modern Odyssey. The theme of this project revolves around the many prejudices of psychological problems and bullying behaviour.

Bandmembers 

 Patrick Knight – producer, main and backing vocals, bongos, electronic sounds (1990–present)
 Javier Rodriguez Iglesias (DJ Linetech) – synthesizers, keyboards, electronic sounds (1990–1996, 2016–2019)
 Peter Goos – synthesizers, keyboards (1996–1998)
 Ambrosia Dash – main vocals, backing vocals (1990–1993, 2016–present)
 Marc Broeckx – backing vocals, roadie, mental coach, photographer (1990–present)
 Charles Temmerman – backing vocals (1990–1993) †17 December 2021
 Alex da Luz – dancer (1996–2012)
 Jorg Vander Heyden – dancer, graphic designer (1996–2019)
 Cindy De Voeght  C.J. – main vocals, backing vocals, dancer (1996–1997)
 Sofie – dancer (1996–1997)
 Andrew Williams – main vocals, backing vocals, wind instruments, graphic designer (2016–present)
 Adrian Cogen – dancer (2016–present)
 Suzanne Vuegen – dancer (2016–present)

Discography

Albums 
 The Early Years  2016  (CD Baby/Gravity Productions UPC 191061029427)
 The Early Years was Gravity Noir's very first studio album after years of silence and subsequent reformation in 2016. The album is a collection of studio recordings made between 1990 and 1998. These recordings were originally used as demos, promotions and public relations purposes. Due to the lack of financial means, the release of singles and compact discs was repeatedly postponed. The only three songs to be officially released were 'Time (Clock of the heart)' in 1990 as a single, and originally a solo project by lead singer and founder of 'Gravity Noir' Patrick Knight. The remix of the well-known Culture Club song was not a great success and the title was changed for album purposes to 'Time (90's House Remix)'. 'I've Got The Power', as a CD single which as an act was appreciated by the audience during the many live performances, and probably mainly because of the extravagant appearance of Patrick Knight as Drag queen 'Titless Strangé'. The single was only officially released in 2011 with a picture of 'Titless Strangé' on the cover and under the name of 'The Sisters of Divine Pleasure featuring Patrick Knight'. It is one of the many name changes that the group used. And Everything I Own, one of the 12 songs on a compilation LP record called 'Pieter Viking presents Joepie's top 12 soundmix'. The album consists of 5 self-written songs and 6 cover songs. Besides Time (Clock of the Heart) and Do You Really Want to Hurt Me the album contains covers of Los Bravos, Orchestral Manoeuvres in the Dark, Frankie Goes to Hollywood, and Bread (band). In 1997 an official music video clip was made of 'Enola Gay', also the only one, which was broadcast on Belgian television channel FilmNet. This time they changed their name to 'B6' (Basics), but this name again did not lead to success.
 Handmade  2016  (CD Baby/Indieplant/Gravity Productions UPC 0680596923527)
 Liberation  2017  (CD Baby/Gravity Productions UPC 191924097662)
 The Singles  2017  (CD Baby/Gravity Productions UPC 191924217718)
 The Remixes  2017  (CD Baby/Gravity Productions UPC 191924450573)
 Future Days  2020  (CD Baby/Gravity Productions UPC 192914889168)
 ANKH  2022  (CD Baby/Gravity Productions UPC 198000232641)

Extended plays 
 Welcome to My Gravity EP 2016  (CD Baby/Gravity Productions UPC 191061056942)
 The Remix EP  2016  (CD Baby/Gravity Productions UPC 190394642938)
 Into a New World EP 2017  (CD Baby/Gravity Productions UPC 191924194972)(Expected 30 October 2020)
 All Night Long EP 2020  (CD Baby/Gravity Productions UPC 194660365699)

Singles 
 I've Got the Power 2011 23 April 2011
 Mystery Knight 2016 7 April 2016
 Mind the Gap 2016 18 April 2016
 Giving Up On Music (Summer Dance Remix) 2016 6 June 2016
 Another Dimension (Dementia) 2016 15 August 2016
 Avalon L.A. 2017 31 January 2017
 Much Too Soon to Say Goodbye 2017 10 March 2017
 Mystery Knight (2017 Liberation Version) 2017 7 April 2017
 Into a New World 2017 1 May 2017
 Open Your Mind 2017 18 June 2017
 Open Your Mind (The Future is Ours Remix) 2018 21 September 2018
 Boom and I'll be There (Trixie's GagaGoBoom Remix) 2018 25 January 2018
 Flying High 2019 22 March 2019
 Hot Summer Medley 2019 6 June 2019
 Planet Called Love 2019 31 July 2019
 Universal Party (Supernatural) 2020 14 February 2020
 All Night Long (A Tribute to Andrè Brasseur) 2021 18 January 2021
 Im Nin Alu 2021 2021 14 July 2021
 In Time (ANKH, Travelogue Pt.8) 2022 17 January 2022

Charts songs

Singles

Music videos & Movies

References

External links 

 
 Gravity Noir repertory at ASCAP
 Gravity Noir at Musicbrainz
 Gravity Noir at Feature.fm
 
 
 
 
 

Electronic dance music groups
English synth-pop groups